Eta is a female given name. Notable people with the name include:

Eta Boeriu (1923–1984), Romanian writer
Eta Cohen (1916–2012), English violinist
Eta Hentz (1895-1986), Hungarian-American fashion designer (working as Madame Eta)
Eta Linnemann (1926–2009), German theologian
Eta Tyrmand (1917–2008), Belarusian composer

See also
Etta (given name)

Feminine given names